Malaysia participated in the 2017 ASEAN Para Games from 17 to 23 September 2017 as the host nation of the 9th edition of the Games. The Malaysian contingent was represented by 326 athletes and 167 officials.
 
In all, Malaysian contingents collected a haul of 90 gold medals, below than the targeted 103 gold medals. They also been awarded with 85 silver and 83 bronze medals, concluding the Games as second ranked nation.

Medal summary

Medal by sport

Medal by Date

Medalists

References

ASEAN Para Games
2017 ASEAN Para Games
Malaysia 2017 
ASEAN Para Games, 2017
ASEAN Para Games, 2017